Devon was a European Parliament constituency covering all of Devon in England, with the exception of the city of Plymouth.

Prior to its uniform adoption of proportional representation in 1999, the United Kingdom used first-past-the-post for the European elections in England, Scotland and Wales. The European Parliament constituencies used under that system were smaller than the later regional constituencies and only had one Member of the European Parliament each.

When it was created in England in 1979, it consisted of the Westminster Parliament constituencies of Devon North, Devon West, Exeter, Honiton, Tiverton, Torbay and Totnes.  In 1984, Totnes was replaced by South Hams and Teignbridge, while Devon West was replaced by Devon West and Torridge. During the fifteen-year existence of the Devon European Parliamentary constituency, it was represented by Charles Strachey, 4th Baron O'Hagan, until his resignation in 1994.

The constituency was replaced by Devon and East Plymouth and parts of Dorset and East Devon and Somerset and North Devon in 1994.  These seats became part of the much larger South West England constituency in 1999.

Members of the European Parliament

Results

References

External links
 David Boothroyd's United Kingdom Election Results 

European Parliament constituencies in England (1979–1999)
Politics of Devon
1979 establishments in England
1994 disestablishments in England
Constituencies established in 1979
Constituencies disestablished in 1994